Gironde (US usually  , ;) is the largest department in the Nouvelle-Aquitaine region of Southwestern France. Named after the Gironde estuary, a major waterway, its prefecture is Bordeaux. In 2019, it had a population of 1,623,749. The famous Bordeaux wine region is in Gironde. It has six arrondissements, making it one of the departments with the most arrondissements (Nord also has six, while Pas-de-Calais has the most of any department, with seven).

History
Gironde is one of the original 83 departments created during the French Revolution on 4 March 1790. It was created from parts of the former provinces of Guyenne and Gascony.

From 1793 to 1795, the department's name was changed to Bec-d'Ambès to avoid the association with the Girondist political party of the French Revolution.

In July 2022, Gironde was affected by large wildfires.

Geography
Gironde is part of the current region of Nouvelle-Aquitaine and is surrounded by the departments of Landes, Lot-et-Garonne, Dordogne and Charente-Maritime and the Atlantic Ocean on the west. With an area of 10,000 km2, Gironde is the largest department in metropolitan France.  If overseas departments are included, however, Gironde's land area is dwarfed by the 83,846 km2 of French Guiana.

Gironde is well known for the Côte d'Argent beach which is Europe's longest, attracting many surfers to Lacanau each year. It is also the birthplace of Jacques-Yves Cousteau who studied the sea and all forms of life in water.

The Great Dune of Pyla in Arcachon Bay near Bordeaux is the tallest sand dune in Europe.

Demographics

Principal towns

The most populous commune is Bordeaux, the prefecture. As of 2019, there are 7 communes with more than 30,000 inhabitants:

Politics
The President of the Departmental Council is Jean-Luc Gleyze of the Socialist Party.

Current National Assembly Representatives

Tourism

See also
Cantons of the Gironde department
Communes of the Gironde department
Arrondissements of the Gironde department
Bordeaux wine regions
Château du Mirail (Brouqueyran)

References

External links
  Departmental Council website
  Prefecture website

  
  Tourism Office website

 
1790 establishments in France
Departments of Nouvelle-Aquitaine
States and territories established in 1790